The 2022 Nonthaburi Challenger III was a professional tennis tournament played on hard courts. It was the 3rd edition of the tournament which was part of the 2022 ATP Challenger Tour. It took place in Nonthaburi, Thailand from 5 to 11 September 2022.

Singles main-draw entrants

Seeds

 1 Rankings are as of 29 August 2022.

Other entrants
The following players received wildcards into the singles main draw:
  Yuttana Charoenphon
  Pruchya Isaro
  Pol Wattanakul

The following player received entry into the singles main draw as an alternate:
  James McCabe

The following players received entry from the qualifying draw:
  Gage Brymer
  Makoto Ochi
  Stuart Parker
  Ajeet Rai
  Kasidit Samrej
  Yuta Shimizu

Champions

Singles

 Stuart Parker def.  Arthur Cazaux 6–4, 4–1 ret.

Doubles

 Chung Yun-seong /  Ajeet Rai def.  Francis Alcantara /  Christopher Rungkat 6–1, 7–6(8–6).

References

2022 in Thai sport
2022 ATP Challenger Tour
September 2022 sports events in Thailand